Robert Gaines is an American politician who served as a member of the King County Council from 1977 to 1978. A member of the Democratic Party, he represented the 9th district.

References 

Living people
King County Councillors
Year of birth missing (living people)
Democratic Party members of the Washington House of Representatives